脳みそショートケーキ (Noumiso Shortcake) is the 2nd album by the Japanese art punk band つしまみれ (Tsu Shi Ma Mi Re).

Track listing
"エアコンのリモコン"　EAKON no RIMOKON / Air Conditioner Remote
"バカ元カレー"　BAKA moto KAREE / Stupid Ex-Boyfriend
"脳みそショートケーキ"　Noumiso SHOOTO KEEKI / Brain Shortcake
"良いテンポです。"　Yoi TENPO desu. / It's a Good Tempo.
"キューティービューティーキューピー"　KYUUTII BYUUTII KYUUPII / Cutie Beauty Kewpie
"ママのうた"　MAMA no uta / Mama's song
"パンクさん"　PANKU san / Mr. Punk
enhanced CD『エアコンのリモコン』

English titles are approximate translations.

External links
 Purchase this album @ HMV
 Purchase this album @ Amazon

2007 albums
Tsu Shi Ma Mi Re albums